Louis Isaac de Beausobre (19 August 1730 – 3 December 1783) was a German philosopher and political economist of French Huguenot descent. He was born in Berlin, the son of the French Protestant churchman and ecclesiastical historian Isaac de Beausobre and his second wife, Charlotte Schwarz. He is not to be confused with his elder half-brother, the pastor and theologian Charles Louis de Beausobre (1690–1753).

Beausobre was educated at the Collège Français in Berlin, where he was taught and greatly influenced by Johann Heinrich Samuel Formey. He went on to study philosophy at Frankfurt an der Oder, and later in Paris. On his return to Berlin he was received as a member of the Prussian Academy of Sciences in 1755.

Frederick the Great, out of esteem for Isaac de Beausobre, adopted Louis as his son, and supported him in his studies.

Works
 Dissertations philosophiques, dont la première roule sur la nature du feu, et la seconde sur les différentes parties de la philosophie et des mathématiques (1753) Online text
 Le Pyrrhonisme du sage (1754)
 Le Pyrrhonisme raisonnable (1755) (a second edition of Le Pyrrhonisme du sage) Online text
 Nouvelles considérations sur les années climatériques, la longueur de la vie de l’homme, la propagation du genre humain, et la vraie puissance des États, considérée dans la plus grande population (1757) Online text
 Essai sur le bonheur, ou Réflexions philosophiques sur les biens et les maux de la vie humaine (1758) Online text
 Introduction générale à l'étude de la politique, des finances et du commerce (1764) Online text
 "Réflexions sur la nature et les causes de la folie", published in 5 parts in Histoire de l'Académie royale des sciences et des belles-lettres for 1759 and 1760 (1766-7)
 "Réflexions sur les songes", published in Histoire de l'Académie royale des sciences et des belles-lettres for 1762 (1769)
 "Sur l'enthusiasme", published in Nouveaux Mémoires de l'Académie royale for 1779 (1781)

Further reading

External links
 

1730 births
1783 deaths
French Protestants
18th-century French male writers
18th-century French philosophers
18th-century German philosophers
18th-century German economists
Members of the Prussian Academy of Sciences
Writers from Berlin
Französisches Gymnasium Berlin alumni
German male writers